State Route 168 (SR 168) is a state highway in Clark County, Nevada, United States. The route was designated as the southern end of State Route 7 in 1919, and served as part of US 93 from 1931 to 1967.

Route description

The western terminus of SR 168 is in northern Clark County, near the proposed planned community of Coyote Springs. The route begins at the junction with US 93 east of the Sheep Range on the eastern border of the Desert National Wildlife Refuge. From there, the route enters the town of
Moapa in the Moapa River Indian Reservation. After another , the highway enters Glendale. Just shy of accessing Interstate 15 at the Glendale interchange (exit 90), SR 168 turns north onto Lewis Ranch Road through the town to end at exit 91 on I-15.

History
State Route 168 has existed as part of Nevada's state highway system since 1919. In that year, the Nevada Legislature amended the general highway law to add State Route 7, which was vaguely defined as "commencing at the city of Ely and running thence southerly through Pioche to Las Vegas."  The southern terminus of SR 7 was later truncated to Glendale, with its southernmost miles following the alignment of present-day SR 168.

At a meeting held on June 8, 1931, the American Association of State Highway Officials (AASHO) approved an extension of U.S. Route 93 through Nevada. This extension brought the southern end of that route from Wells to Glendale. South of Ely, the extension of US 93 was routed over State Route 7, including the portion northwest of Glendale. AASHO ordered another southerly extension of US 93 to Arizona via Las Vegas in 1935, which was signed by 1939.  The routing of US 93 via the Glendale–Moapa segment remained in place until 1967. In that year, a shorter route connecting Las Vegas and Caliente was completed, bypassing Glendale.  The  of highway northwest of Glendale remained in the state highway system, still marked as State Route 7.

After the removal of US 93 from the route, the southerly segment of SR 7 remained unchanged for several years. On July 1, 1976, the Nevada Department of Transportation initiated the renumbering of Nevada's state highways. In this process, the highway was renumbered to State Route 168.  This change was first seen on the 1978 edition of the state's highway map.

Major intersections

See also

References

External links

168
Transportation in Clark County, Nevada